Gaussia princeps, commonly known as palma de sierra, is a palm which is endemic to Cuba.  The species grows on steep-sided limestone hills (known as mogotes) in Pinar del Río Province in western Cuba.

Gaussia princeps trees are 8 metres (or more) tall with whitish stems which are swollen at the base and tapering above.  Stems are 30 centimetres in diameter at the base.  Trees have three to six pinnately compound leaves.  Fruit is orange-red, 1 cm long and 7 millimetres in diameter, with one to three seeds.

References

princeps
Trees of Cuba